Eleanor Jarman (born Ella Berendt, April 22, 1901 – date of death unknown) was an American fugitive and convicted robber who was imprisoned and escaped from custody in 1940. Jarman was never apprehended, and her ultimate whereabouts remain unknown.

Early life and crime career

Jarman was the youngest of eight children born to Julius and Amelia Berendt, in Sioux City, Iowa. She married and had two children with a man called Leroy Jarman. When he abandoned the family, she moved to Chicago, Illinois, and worked in odd jobs until she met George Dale. Dale supported her, although she later claimed that she did not know Dale did it by robbery.

On August 4, 1933, Dale, Jarman and Leo Minneci tried to rob a clothing store in Chicago's far West Side. In a struggle with the shop owner, Gustav Hoeh, Jarman clawed at him, but then Dale shot him.

When the robbers drove away, several witnesses noted the license plate. That led police to Minneci, who blamed the other two, who were soon arrested. Dale blamed Minneci for the robbery. Jarman said that she did not know which one did it. She claimed she was in the back room looking for clothes.

However, witnesses described how Jarman and Dale had entered the store and claimed she had threatened the clerk. Press made her a major player in all of Dale's crimes, dubbed her "the Blond Tigress" and compared her to Bonnie Parker (of Bonnie and Clyde).

Jarman was not tried for robberies but for complicity in Hoeh's murder. Her defense attorney was A. Jefferson Schultze. The prosecuting attorney, Wilbur Crowley, called for the death penalty.

George Dale was sentenced to die in the electric chair. As his last wish, he wrote a love letter to Jarman. Minneci and Jarman were sentenced to jail—Jarman for 199 years, one of the longest criminal sentences ever imposed at the time. Her children were sent to live with her older sister and her husband, Hattie and Joe Stocker, in Sioux City, Iowa.

After imprisonment

A model prisoner
For the next seven years, Jarman was a model prisoner at the Dwight Correctional Center (Illinois). In 1940, according to her family, she heard that her son was about to run away from home and, concerned about her children, escaped the prison on August 8, 1940, with another inmate, Mary Foster. She apparently went to Sioux City, Iowa, confirmed that her children were all right and then went underground.

The 1975 meeting
Over the next 35 years, Jarman maintained surreptitious contact with her family through classified ads. In 1975, she arranged a secret meeting with her brother Otto Berendt, his wife Dorothy, and Jarman's son Leroy, by then in middle-age. During this meeting, which the family disclosed decades later, Leroy tried to persuade his mother to give herself up. She refused and said that she was not worried about capture, believing the authorities had long since stopped looking for her. Communications with her family through newspaper ads tapered off in the mid-1990s. A 1993 petition to grant Jarman a pardon failed.

See also
Fugitives from justice
List of fugitives from justice who disappeared

References

Further reading
  Ella Berendt, 22 Apr 1901; citing Sioux City, Woodbury, Iowa, United States; county district courts, Iowa; FHL microfilm 1,451,573.

The Malefactor's Register Article on Eleanor Jarman

1901 births
American escapees
American female murderers
American female organized crime figures
American people convicted of murder
Escapees from Illinois detention
Fugitives wanted by the United States
Fugitives wanted on murder charges
Fugitives wanted on robbery charges
People convicted of murder by Illinois
People from Chicago
Year of death unknown
People from Sioux City, Iowa